This is a list of Danish football transfers for the 2009 summer transfer window. Only moves featuring at least one Danish Superliga club are listed.

The Danish Superliga 2008–09 season ended on May 31(2009), with the Danish Superliga 2009–10 season starting on July 18(2009). The summer transfer window opened on 1 July 2009, although a few transfers took place prior to that date; including carry-overs from the winter 2008–09 transfer window. The window closed at midnight on 31 August 2009.

Transfers

Notes
 Player will officially join his new club on 1 July 2009.

References

Danish
2009
2008–09 in Danish football
2009–10 in Danish football